The English toponymic surname Egerton may refer to:

Politics
 Alfred Egerton (1854–1890), British politician
 Algernon Egerton (1825–1891), British politician
 Lady Alice Egerton (1923–1977), British courtier
 Arthur Egerton, 3rd Earl of Wilton (1833–1885), British peer and politician
 Edward Egerton (1816–1869), British politician
 Sir Edwin Egerton (1841–1916), British ambassador
 George Egerton, 2nd Earl of Ellesmere (1823–1862), British peer and politician
 Sir Roland Egerton, 1st Baronet (died 1646), English landowner and politician 
 Samuel Egerton (1711–1780), British politician
 Scroop Egerton, 1st Duke of Bridgewater (1681–1744), British peer and courtier
 Wilbraham Egerton (MP died 1856) (1781–1856), British landowner and politician
 Wilbraham Egerton, 1st Earl Egerton (1832–1909), British nobleman, businessman and politician
 William Egerton (originally William Tatton) (1749–1806), English politician

Sports
 Billy Egerton (1891–1934), English footballer
 Bob Egerton (born 1963), Australian rugby player
 David Egerton (1961–2021), English former rugby union player

Military
 Caledon Egerton (1814–1874), British Army general
 Ernest Albert Egerton (1897–1966), English soldier, Victoria Cross recipient
 George Egerton (Royal Navy officer) (1852–1940), British admiral
 Lebbeus Egerton (1773–1846), Vermont militia officer, farmer, Lieutenant Governor

Arts
 Daniel Egerton (1772–1835), English actor
 Daniel Thomas Egerton (1797–1842), British landscape painter
 Elizabeth Egerton (1626–1663), English writer
 Frank Egerton (born 1959), British novelist
 Helen Merrill Egerton (1866-1951), Canadian writer 
 Judy Egerton (1928–2012), Australian-born British art historian and curator
 Julian Egerton (1848–1945), British clarinetist
 Sarah Fyge Egerton (1670–1723), English poet
 Sarah Egerton (actress) (1782–1847), English actress
 Seymour Egerton, 4th Earl of Wilton (1839–1898), British peer and musician
 Tamsin Egerton (born 1988), English actress and model
 Taron Egerton (born 1989), Welsh actor

Other
 Henry Egerton (died 1746), British clergyman, Bishop of Hereford
 Jack Egerton (1918–1998), Australian trade unionist
 Walter Egerton (1858–1947), British colonial administrator

Disambiguation
 Charles Egerton (disambiguation)
 Francis Egerton (disambiguation)
 John Egerton (disambiguation)
 Philip Egerton (disambiguation)
 Stephen Egerton (disambiguation)
 Thomas Egerton (disambiguation)

Given name
 Egerton Cecil (1853–1928), English cricketer
 Sir Egerton Coghill (1853–1921), Irish painter
 Egerton Leigh (1815–1876), British soldier, landowner, politician and author
 Egerton Marcus (born 1965), Canadian retired boxer
 Egerton Herbert Norman (1909–1957; better known as E. Herbert Norman, E. H. Norman, or simply Herbert Norman), a Canadian diplomat accused of being a Communist who committed suicide
 Egerton Ryerson (1803–1882), Canadian Methodist minister, educator, politician and public education advocate
 Egerton Ryerson Young (1840–1909), Canadian teacher, Methodist missionary, lecturer, and author
 Egerton Swartwout (1870–1943), American architect
 Egerton Ryerson Young (1840–1909), author of My Dogs in the Northland (1902), which Jack London used as source material for The Call of the Wild (1903)

See also
 Egerton family, British aristocratic family

English-language surnames
English toponymic surnames
Given names originating from a surname